The Women's 10K open water swimming race at the 2007 World Championships was held on March 20, 2007 at the beach St Kilda.

Result

See also
2005 World Aquatics Championships
2006 FINA World Open Water Championships
2008 FINA World Open Water Championships
Open water swimming at the 2009 World Aquatics Championships – Women's 10 km

References

World Aquatics Championships
Open water swimming at the 2007 World Aquatics Championships
2007 in women's swimming